Fox Primary School is a primary school in London for children between the ages of 4 and 11, in the Royal Borough of Kensington and Chelsea. It is located on Kensington Place, between Kensington Church Street and Notting Hill Gate.

The school has a playground on each side. Prior to the 1960s the school was infants only, aged 5 – 7.  The Junior School was adjacent, a Church of England school called St George's School. St George's had no playground and shared the Fox School playgrounds. During the Second World War, pupils from the school were evacuated and taught at Lacock Abbey, Wiltshire. The school has a large new addition to its land, completed in 2017. The school is considering an alliance with Ashburnham Community School.

History

It was founded in 1842 as a charity school by Hon. Caroline Fox (3 Nov 1767 - 12 Mar 1845), of Little Holland House, Kensington, who died unmarried aged 78.

She was the only daughter of Stephen Fox, 2nd Baron Holland (1745-1774), of Holland House, Kensington, (son of Henry Fox, 1st Baron Holland (1705-1774) by his wife Lady Caroline Lennox (1723-1774))  by his wife Lady Mary FitzPatrick, a daughter of John FitzPatrick, 1st Earl of Upper Ossory. Hon. Caroline Fox was the only sister  of Henry Vassall-Fox, 3rd Baron Holland (1773-1840), of Holland House, who owned most of the land within the manor of Kensington, and was a niece of the Whig statesman Charles James Fox (1749-1806), who made Holland House a famous meeting place of prominent Whig politicians. In 1802 she was living at Little Holland House, in the grounds of Holland House.

The school was established "for the education of children of the labouring, manufacturing and other poorer classes" of Kensington. Its original location was near her home of Little Holland House (now demolished) on the west side of today's Holland Park, to the west of today's number 14 Holland Park Road, a house built for the painter Val Prinsep on the Holland House estate, which is next to Leighton House (12 Holland Park Road) the house built for the painter Lord Leighton. In 1876 it was taken over by  the London School Board, which moved it to a new site in Silver Street, today the northern end of Kensington Church Street. In 1877 the original site of the school in Holland Park Road was sold by auction for £2,650, and in its place was built the present Nos. 20–30 (even) Holland Park Road, a group of six two-storey studio residences arranged around a courtyard with an arched entrance, originally called "The Studios". The school moved a third time in 1937 to its present site on Kensington Place.

Notable former pupils
Melissa Benn
Nathaniel Parker
Darcey Bussell
Sophia Myles
Miquita Oliver
Shawn Emanuel
Milton Mermikides

Notable former teachers
Ivor Cutler
Honor Blackman

Citations

References

External links 
 School profile on Directgov
 2009 test scores
 2005 test scores
 OFSTED reports

Primary schools in the Royal Borough of Kensington and Chelsea
Community schools in the Royal Borough of Kensington and Chelsea
Educational institutions established in 1842
1842 establishments in England